The Crimean barbel (Barbus tauricus) is a species of ray-finned fish in the genus Barbus.

References 

 

tauricus
Cyprinid fish of Asia
Cyprinid fish of Europe
Fish described in 1877